Naragh (also Romanized as Narāq; also known as Nareh Ţavīl and Narāk) is a city in the Central District of Delijan County, Markazi Province, Iran.  At the 2006 census, its population was 2,508 in 826 families.

Naragh is an old city with 130 historical buildings and sites.

Chal-nakhjir cave or Delijan cave 2 is one of the natural touristic attractions of Delijan.3Mulla Ahmad Naraghi is one of the well known clergies in Naraq.

Gallery

References

Populated places in Delijan County

Cities in Markazi Province